Yang Hong-seok may refer to:
 Yang Hong-seok or Hongseok, member of South Korean boy group Pentagon
 Yang Hong-seok (basketball)